is a Japanese speed skater. She competed in four events at the 2006 Winter Olympics.

References

1985 births
Living people
Japanese female speed skaters
Olympic speed skaters of Japan
Speed skaters at the 2006 Winter Olympics
Asian Games medalists in speed skating
Asian Games bronze medalists for Japan
Medalists at the 2003 Asian Winter Games
Medalists at the 2011 Asian Winter Games
Speed skaters at the 2003 Asian Winter Games
Speed skaters at the 2011 Asian Winter Games
Speed skaters at the 2007 Asian Winter Games
Sportspeople from Hokkaido
People from Obihiro, Hokkaido
20th-century Japanese women
21st-century Japanese women